"Dominoes" is a song by American singer Robbie Nevil from his self-titled debut album in 1986.

Written by Nevil with Bobby Hart and Dick Eastman, Nevil recorded the song for his eponymous debut album, and it was released as the second single in a shorter version remixed by Arthur Baker. It reached #14 on the U.S. singles chart and #26 on the Canadian singles chart.
MTV featured a portion of the refrain with reworked lyrics to promote their new show at the time, Friday Night Party Zone.

Track listing

A-Side
"Dominoes (Extended Vocal Remix)" Remix By Arthur Baker
"Dominoes (Dom Dom Domino Dub)". Remix by Arthur Baker

B-Side
"Neighbors"

References

1986 singles
Robbie Nevil songs
Songs written by Robbie Nevil
Songs written by Bobby Hart
Song recordings produced by Alex Sadkin
Song recordings produced by Phil Thornalley
Manhattan Records singles
1986 songs